David Downes, born 1967 in Wellington, New Zealand, is a composer of theatre and film scores, orchestral and electro-acoustic pieces.  He is particularly known for his work with choreographers, and for dance-inspired music, including two CD releases, Saltwater and The Rusted Wheel of Things (originally released as Pavilion).

Downes served as a musical consultant for the 2005 film River Queen, and won the inaugural RealWorld Remixed competition as Multiman.

External links 
Biography of the composer

1967 births
Living people
New Zealand composers
Male composers